
The following lists events that happened during 1815 in South Africa.

Events
 Shaka becomes king of the Zulus
 Slagter's Nek Rebellion
 30 May - The Arniston, a British troop transport East Indiaman, is wrecked at Waenhuiskrans near Cape Agulhas while returning from the British campaigns in Ceylon

Births
 12 March - Cornelis Moll, founder of the first Natal newspaper De Natalier, is born as the 24th child in Cape Town

Deaths

 29 December - Saartjie Baartman, the "Hottentot Venus", dies in Paris.

References
See Years in South Africa for list of References

 
South Africa
Years in South Africa